Princess Eleonore-Christine of Schaumburg-Lippe (German: Eleonore-Christine Eugenie Benita Feodora Maria Prinzessin zu Schaumburg-Lippe; born 22 December 1978 at Hørsholm, Denmark) is the only daughter of Prince Waldemar of Schaumburg-Lippe and his first wife, Anne-Lise Johansen. Princess Eleonore-Christine is a twice great-great-granddaughter of King Frederick VIII of Denmark.

Biography

Education
She attended Krebs Skole, after which she graduated in Marketing from Niels Brock HH 3-Year Business College between 1994 and 1997, as a Market Economist specialized in International Marketing from Hillerød Erhvervsakademi between 1997 and 1999, in Psychology, IT and Communication at the Daghøjskole 4-Month Course in 2000, as a Multimedia Designer specialized in Interactive Communication in Københavns Erhvervsakademi, Lygten, between 2002 and 2004, earning a Certificate Course as a Sales-Marketing Coordinator with focus on Project Management, Sales and DTP at Soft Advice 7-Month Course in 2005, graduating in HD 2.del Organization and Management specialized in Corporate Communication and Strategic Development from Copenhagen Business College from 2008 and 2010, earning a Master's Degree in Security and Diplomacy with the Masters Thesis "Security Aspects in the Arctic Region" in the SNSPA - Scoala Nationala de Studii Politice si Administrative between 2012 and 2014 and graduated in Online Marketing at the Bigum & Co Online Marketing Module from KEAs Digital Marketing Academy Module, in the Courses Facebook and Social Media, E-mail Marketing, Content Marketing (CM), SEO, Google Adwords and Analytics and Website Usability and Conversion Optimization in 2015. She learned to speak Danish, English, Romanian and German.

Career
She started working as an International Research Interviewer in both telephone and face-to-face interviews, in focus groups and in administrative work between 1999 and 2001, as womanpower in a temporary customer service in both the Danish bank Danske Bank and the television company Viasat inbound customer services and in the outbound sales B-t-B for television company TDC in 2001. In 2002, she worked as a Journalist and sales consultant for "People Magazine", a magazine distributed only to an exclusive area in Denmark, making interviews, being in charge of sales and as a developer of a customer database.

She worked in Denmark, from 2005, between 2005 and 2007 as a Marketing Coordinator at Escales, a distributor and agent in Scandinavia of French clothing for ladies on the B-t-B market, being responsible for the communication to the dealers in Scandinavia and a developer of the website and online web shop, as well as in the production of marketing materials and as a participant at fashion fairs to promote the clothes. Meanwhile, starting in 2006 and until 2011, she was a Freelance Journalist for "Her & Nu" / "Egmont", a weekly magazine covering cultural events. From 2007, after the first employment, and at the same with the second one and until 2012, she was also a Project Manager at DRRB - Danish Advertising Association, which was part of the Danish Chamber of Commerce, where she was a contact person for the agency members, coordinator of digital courses, making cooperative agreements for the members, part of the educational committee, responsible for print publications of "Bureauoversigten" and "Media Scandinavia", redesign and maintenance of the website and co-responsible for Index DK / Gallup, the index numbers from the media, while working in 2009 for KEA Københavns Erhvervs Akademi as a Co-Concept Developer of the Bachelor Education as a creative bachelor in digital business concepts, with a focus on E-concept development.

From 2011 on, she worked in Romania, where she was a Member part of the Ethical Committee of RAC - Romanian Advertising Council, a self-regulatory authority in the field of advertising, maintaining a legal, ethical and moral environment in commercial communication, as a Delegate from UAPR - The Romanian Advertising Association, where she was also an Administrative Director between February 2011 and January 2014, both seated in Bucharest; UAPR was rewarded by RAC for its "Special Involvement in Self-Regulation" for the year 2013, based on her active participation in the committee, which ended in 2014. In that time, she worked in building UAPR up, together with the Board, in 2022 being 44 advertising and media agencies who are members of the association, as well as a contact person for the agency members, forwarding information about new rules and regulations to the members and a project manager of surveys: salary survey, agency-client survey, coordinator of advertising events, the association winning the awards "Effies" and "20 Years of Creativity", and organizing several EACA courses a year with trainers from Great Britain and Northern Ireland, Germany, Denmark and Austria training the UAPR members in Romania. From 2012 to 2014, she was a Boardmember of the DRBA - Danish Romanian Business Association at the Embassy of Denmark in Romania, which main objective was to identify commercial and regulatory obstacles for Danish Companies in Romania, and to promote Danish interest in outreach activities. During the same period, between October 2011 and August 2014 she worked as the Columnist of "Bucharest City Tales" at "Romania-Insider.com", also in Bucharest, where she wrote a weekly article about life as an expat in Romania.

Returning to Denmark, she worked between April and October 2015 as a Campaign Coordinator for Copenhagen for The Alternative, a brand new Green political party, during and after the election campaign for the Parliament, assisting the 10 candidates in Copenhagen, coordinating volunteers, organizing events and as the responsible for the internal communication, the party ending up getting 9 mandates in Parliament. Between February and April 2016, she was the Communications Officer of the Forbrugerådet Tænk - Danish Consumer Council, also in Copenhagen, writing and updating articles for www.Taenk.dk, the sitecore CMS, writing content and sending out two weekly newsletters, gathering information and layout of the Annual Report 2015 and making updates its intranet. From May 2016 to May 2017, she worked as a Secretary and Visa Employee for the Consulate of Liberia in Copenhagen, doing secretarial tasks for the Honorary Consul of the Republic of Liberia and issuing visas for Nordic travelers into that country, and, during the exact same period andin the same capital city, as a Project Assistant and Receptionist for NIRAS International Consulting, working in Project Administration and secretarial tasks. Also in Copenhagen and in the same year of 2016, between July and December, she was a Volunteer Advisor for Folk & Sikkerhed, where she assisted the head of the secretariat with the organizing of Folk & Sikkerheds annual conference in Security Policy held on 25 November 2016 at the Parliament.

From January 2017 on, she has been employed as a book reviewer for Det Krigsvidenskabelige Selskab, the Royal Danish Society for Military Science, and as a film and theatre critic for "Kulturtid.dk", in Copenhagen. Since January 2019, she is a Lecturer at Arte Booking, and since May 2019, she is Vice Chairwoman, Editor and Writer for the magazine "rØST".

References

 Eleonore av Schaumburg-Lippe on LinkedIn

1978 births
Living people
House of Lippe
Princesses of Schaumburg-Lippe